The Collection is a 2012 American horror film, serving as the sequel to the 2009 film, The Collector. Written by Patrick Melton and Marcus Dunstan, and directed by Dunstan, the film stars Randall Archer, Emma Fitzpatrick, Christopher McDonald, Lee Tergesen, and Josh Stewart, who reprises his role as Arkin from the first film. The story follows a young woman who gets captured by The Collector, while Arkin escapes but is recruited shortly after by a group of mercenaries whose mission is to save her at the Collector's base.

The Collection was released on November 30, 2012, by LD Entertainment. The film received generally negative reviews by critics, who deemed it a slight improvement over its predecessor. A third film, The Collected, was in production in 2019 but was suspended shortly after and shelved indefinitely.

Plot

A few weeks after the events of the first film, teenager Elena Peters and her friends, Missy and Josh, go to a party. Elena witnesses her boyfriend, Brian, with another woman. She leaves the dance floor and enters an isolated room. In the room, Elena finds a box which Arkin is trapped. Elena carefully opens the latches, releasing Arkin, as a series of traps are set off party, killing dozens of party goers. Brian tries to escape but is killed while Elena watches in horror. She tries to help Missy, but is unable to prevent her being crushed by an elevator. The Collector appears and kidnaps Elena, while Arkin escapes by jumping out of a window, landing on a car and breaking his arm in the process.

Arkin is taken to the hospital, where he is arrested by the police. After suffering nightmares of his torture from the Collector, he is approached by Lucello, an employee of Elena's wealthy father, who has hired a team of mercenaries to hunt the Collector down and save Elena. Lucello implies that if Arkin leads them to the Collector's hideout, he will expunge Arkin's record. Arkin leads the mercenary group to the Collector's base, an abandoned hotel. Meanwhile, Elena witnesses a man being tortured before escaping from the trunk. Upon the team's arrival, Arkin refuses to go inside, but Lucello forces him at gunpoint to guide them through the hotel. The Collector reenters the room and notices Elena has escaped before being alerted to the team's presence.

Upon entering the hotel, the team is attacked by various people who the Collector has captured and driven insane with drugs, forcing the team to shoot them. Elena discovers another trunk and opens it. A seemingly innocent girl named Abby steps out, pleading to Elena for help before following her through the hotel to look for a way out. While wandering the hotel in separate groups, Arkin, Elena, and Lucello's team all encounter live humans being experimented on and human body parts rearranged to resemble insects, which are displayed in glass cases. Elena is discovered to have a hearing aid by Abby, who claims to be the Collector's favorite and is reluctant to break his rules. Abby screams that Elena is at a disadvantage because of her hearing aid, and will never win. The two are then separated when the Collector finds them.

Elena and Lucello reunite and find Abby, who asks to escape with them. Elena, remembering Abby's earlier outburst, pleads with Lucello not to trust her, but he allows Abby to accompany the group. They find a room with a small window that they cannot escape through, but they see two homeless men outside. Arkin shoots one of the men, knowing that reports of a shooting will draw the police's attention. Abby sabotages their efforts of escaping before being killed by one of the Collector's traps. The Collector finds them and becomes enraged upon seeing Abby's body inside one of his traps. He attacks the group, grabs Elena, and escapes.

As police converge at the hotel, the lights go out throughout the building. Lucello is caught in a trap and has to be left behind. Arkin and Paz find Elena strapped to an autopsy table, but when they approach, they are trapped in a cage that falls from above. The Collector appears and threatens to burn down the building, but Arkin manages to open the cage by having Elena re-break his arm so that he can reach the latch.

The group escapes and finds an exit door to the building, but it is jammed from the outside. The Collector appears again. As the Collector is about to kill Arkin, Lucello intervenes, having escaped from his trap, and sacrifices himself so that Arkin can gain the upper hand. Arkin beats the Collector, throws him down a chute, and sets it on fire. As the building burns down, the firefighters hear Elena's screams and open the door from the outside, allowing Elena and Arkin to escape. As the two sit outside, Arkin notices a pile of trunks and, upon searching inside them, finds the Collector's burned mask with no body.

Sometime later, Arkin manages to track down the Collector's house by researching every registered entomologist within a 200-mile radius of their last encounter. Arkin confronts the unmasked Collector, holds him at gunpoint, and taunts him about his father, a museum curator who, Arkin has learned, was responsible for the Collector's insanity and modus operandi. Arkin announces his intentions of torturing and eventually killing the Collector, so that he can never harm anyone ever again. When the Collector tries to attack him, Arkin forces him into the red trunk and locks him inside.

Cast

 Josh Stewart as Arkin
 Emma Fitzpatrick as Elena
 Courtney Cummings as Elena (Nine years old)
 Christopher McDonald as Mr. Peters
 Lee Tergesen as Lucello
 Andre Royo as Wally
 Tim Griffin as Dre
 Shannon Kane as Paz
 Brandon Molale as Lin
 Erin Way as Abby
 Johanna Braddy as Missy
 Michael Nardelli as Josh
 William Peltz as Brian
 Navi Rawat as Lisa
 Randall Archer as The Collector

 Daniel Sharman as Basil

Release

UK release
The Collection has been licensed for a UK DVD run by eOne, and was released on April 29, 2013.

International distribution
The International distribution rights of The Collection are licensed by Cinema Management Group.

Reception

Critical response

On Rotten Tomatoes, the film has an approval rating of 36% based on 50 reviews, with an average rating of 4.6/10. The site's critics consensus reads, "The Collection offers more grisly thrills and twisted humor than its predecessor; in other words, fun for genre fans, but unpleasant for anyone else." On Metacritic the film has a weighted average score of 38 out of 100, based on 16 critics, indicating "generally unfavorable reviews".

Box office
On its opening weekend, The Collection grossed $3.1 million across 1,403 theaters in the United States, about $500,000 less than the opening weekend of the first film.  The worldwide gross was $8.9 million.

Suspended sequel 
In November 2012, prior to the release of The Collection, series creators Marcus Dunstan and Patrick Melton confirmed a sequel film was in development under the title The Collected. An announcement was made in August 2014 that the film would move forward with LD Entertainment and that Josh Stewart would reprise his role of Arkin. Development continued at a slow place and in September 2018 Bloody Disgusting attributed the underperformance of The Collection as to why the film had stalled out in development.

During May 2019 Stewart unveiled a poster for the film, revealing the project had been revived. Emma Fitzpatrick was slated to return as Elena while Tom Atkins was confirmed as portraying Arkin's father. It was also confirmed that David Brown and Brett Forbes would produce. As LD Entertainment was no longer involved with the project, Brown shopped the film at the Cannes Film Festival and acquired the international rights to the film through his studio Clear Horizon Entertainment.

Filming began on September 23, 2019 in Atlanta with Atkins, Randy Havens, Dot-Marie Jones, and Navi Rawat officially joining the cast. In October, Peter Giles was revealed to be playing The Collector. After eight days of filming, production unexpectedly shut down. The cast expected production to pick up again by late October 2019. Filming was then believed to begin once again in Vancouver in early 2021, but production never took place. In April 2021, Dunstan claimed that props were stolen from the set and that the producers had not been in contact with him since the closure of production and that he does not have the rights to the film, preventing him from finishing it. Melton added that "very little" of the film was shot.

References

External links
 
 
 
 
 

2012 films
2012 horror thriller films
2012 independent films
2010s serial killer films
American horror thriller films
American independent films
American sequel films
American serial killer films
Films scored by Charlie Clouser
Films about kidnapping
Films set in 2011
Films set in Illinois
Films shot in Atlanta
Films shot in Los Angeles
LD Entertainment films
2010s English-language films
2010s American films